The Green Party (SZ) leadership election of 2012 was held on 24 November 2012. Incumbent Ondřej Liška saw competition from former Party Leader Martin Bursík. Liška defeated Bursík and remained the Leader.

Background
Ondřej Liška has been the leader of the Green Party since 2009 when Martin Bursík resigned. On 12 May 2012 Bursík announced his intention to run for the position of Party Leader as he believes that Greens move too much to Left. He stated that he wants Green Party to be a Centrist liberal environmental party. Liška decide to run for another term and face Bursík. Jiří Koreš and Eva Kodymová decided to also run as "protest" Candidates.

Voting
Voting took place on 24 November 2012. Election was seen as a duel between Liška and Bursík. Other Candidates included  Jiří Koreš and Eva Kodymová. Liška won the election with 110 votes against Bursík's 70 votes.

References

Green Party (Czech Republic) leadership elections
Green Party leadership election
Green Party (Czech Republic) leadership election
Indirect elections
Green Party (Czech Republic) leadership election